Gustavo Villalobos (born November 19, 1991) is an American soccer player who currently plays for California United Strikers FC in the National Independent Soccer Association.

Career

College and amateur
Villalobos started his college career at Cal State Northridge in 2010, having sat out 2009 as a red-shirted year. However, he suffered the fourth leg break of his career in 2011, putting him out injured for over 15 months.

After an extended period out of the game, Villalobos signed with the fourth-tier National Premier Soccer League side FC Hasental in 2013.

Professional
After a year with the Swedish side Ånge IF in 2014, Villalobos signed with the Maltese Premier League team Qormi in 2015, but then moved to another Maltese Premier League team, Pembroke Athleta, where he finished as the club's top goalscorer.

Villalobos returned to the United States in May 2016, signing with the United Soccer League side Tulsa Roughnecks. In 2017, Villalobos returned to his home state of California signing with Orange County Soccer Club.

In August 2019, Villalobos returned to professional soccer when he signed with National Independent Soccer Association side California United Strikers FC ahead of the team's inaugural season. He made his debut in the team's first match against Oakland Roots SC, starting the game and scoring the Strikers' second goal on route to a comeback 3–3 draw. On November 10, he started in the West Coast Championship against the Los Angeles Force and scored his team's opening goal. During the subsequent penalty kick shootout Villalobos was successful in his team's penultimate attempt and went on to win the title.

References

External links

Gustavo Villalobos at lagstatistik

1991 births
Living people
American soccer players
Cal State Northridge Matadors men's soccer players
Qormi F.C. players
Pembroke Athleta F.C. players
FC Tulsa players
FC Golden State Force players
Association football forwards
Soccer players from Los Angeles
National Premier Soccer League players
USL Championship players
People from North Hills, Los Angeles
American expatriate soccer players
USL League Two players
American expatriate sportspeople in Sweden
Expatriate footballers in Malta
Expatriate footballers in Sweden
Ånge IF players
American expatriates in Malta
Orange County SC players
United Premier Soccer League players
National Independent Soccer Association players